J. P. Bowersock is an American musician, guitarist, performer, and record producer based in New York City. He has worked with many musicians, including The Strokes, Ryan Adams, RZA, Julian Casablancas and Zerobridge.

References

American audio engineers
American record producers
Living people
Year of birth missing (living people)
Place of birth missing (living people)